Novokuznetsky District is an administrative district (raion), one of the nineteen in Kemerovo Oblast, Russia. As a municipal division, it is incorporated as Novokuznetsky Municipal District. It is located in the center of the oblast and spans it from border to border in the southwest-northeast direction. Its administrative center is the city of Novokuznetsk (which is not administratively a part of the district). As of the 2010 Census, the total population of the district was 50,681.

History
On March 19, 2007 a massive methane explosion ripped through the Ulyanovskaya mine in Novokuznetsky District killing over a hundred people. The mine was the largest coal producing center in Kemerovo Oblast. It is the deadliest mining accident in recent history.

Administrative and municipal status
Within the framework of administrative divisions, Novokuznetsky District is one of the nineteen in the oblast. The city of Novokuznetsk serves as its administrative center, despite being incorporated separately as a city under oblast jurisdiction—an administrative unit with the status equal to that of the districts.

As a municipal division, the district is incorporated as Novokuznetsky Municipal District. Novokuznetsk City Under Oblast Jurisdiction is incorporated separately from the district as Novokuznetsky Urban Okrug.

References

Notes

Sources

Districts of Kemerovo Oblast